Arzubikha is a rural locality (a village) and the administrative center of Slobodskoye Rural Settlement, Kharovsky District, Vologda Oblast, Russia. The population was 325 as of 2002.

Geography 
Arzubikha is located 38 km northeast of Kharovsk (the district's administrative centre) by road. Vatalovo is the nearest rural locality.

References 

Rural localities in Kharovsky District